Brendan Cole (born 23 April 1976) is a New Zealand ballroom dancer, specialising in Latin American dancing. He is most famous for appearing as a professional dancer on the BBC One show, Strictly Come Dancing. From 2005 to 2009, he was a judge on the New Zealand version of the show, Dancing with the Stars.

Early life and career
Cole was born in Christchurch, New Zealand. He has danced since he was six, and moved to the United Kingdom when he was eighteen, where he studied the pasodoble, ballroom and ballet at Donaheys, Clayton, Manchester. Before becoming a professional dancer Cole was a builder and roof layer, having left school at 17.

He danced with Camilla Dallerup, a fellow contestant on the BBC's earlier long-running show Come Dancing, as amateurs from 1996, and from 2002 to 2004 as professionals. They competed for New Zealand: Dallerup is Danish-born. In 2003 Dallerup and Cole were placed 3rd for Latin American at the UK Closed Championships.

In the winter of 2004 he had his first acting experience featuring in the UK feature film Everything to Dance for alongside Sasha Jackson, Travis Oliver and Sally Reeve.

In October 2009, Cole appeared on the New Zealand travel show Intrepid Journeys.  During a hunting lesson filmed in Vanuatu he was shown killing and eating a chicken, prompting international news coverage. In October 2019, he began competing in The X Factor: Celebrity alongside Jeremy Edwards.

Personal life

In 2010, Cole married Zoe Hobbs, a British model, who gave birth to their first child, daughter Aurelia, on Christmas Day 2012. In March 2018, Zoe gave birth to their son Danté. The family now live in Aylesbury, Buckinghamshire.

Televised competitions

In summer 2006, he joined ITV's Love Island and became the runner-up when the show ended on 28 August 2006. Also in that year, he appeared as a guest judge on the fourth episode of Britain's Next Top Model, where he worked with the remaining 10 contestants to teach ballroom dancing prior to judging.

In January 2007, Cole appeared on the BBC's duet show Just the Two of Us as a celebrity, with Beverley Knight as his professional partner. They came second.

Cole represented the United Kingdom at the first Eurovision Dance Contest in September 2007. His dance partner was Camilla Dallerup. The couple were highly praised by British judges yet only managed to finish fifteenth out of the sixteen entrants.

In 2010, he was a celebrity guest team captain on What Do Kids Know? along with Rufus Hound, Joe Swash and Sara Cox on Watch.

In 2019, he participated in Pilgrimage: Road to Rome

In 2022, he appeared as a contestant on the fourteenth series of Dancing on Ice and was partnered with Vanessa Bauer. Cole reached the final and placed second.

Dancing with the Stars (NZ)
Cole has judged New Zealand's version of Strictly Come Dancing, Dancing with the Stars, 2005–2009. In the years when Craig Revel Horwood was one of the other judges the two men's opinions and scores were frequently markedly different.

Strictly Come Dancing

Highest and lowest scoring performances per dance

Cole appeared in the first 15 series BBC One's Strictly Come Dancing, until announcing in January 2018 that his contract had not been renewed.

In the 2004 debut series of Strictly Come Dancing, Cole's celebrity partner was BBC newsreader and presenter Natasha Kaplinsky. They went on to win the show.

In the second series, he was partnered with Casualty actress Sarah Manners. However, they became the fifth couple to leave the competition. During the 2004 Christmas Special Cole again partnered Kaplinsky and they came in second place, dancing a Foxtrot.

In Series 3 Cole was then paired with GMTV presenter and newsreader Fiona Phillips. They were eliminated during the fourth week, coming ninth. Cole then appeared in the 2005 Christmas Special with Rachel Hunter, dancing a Rumba.

He returned to compete on the fourth series, where he partnered with actress Claire King. They were the ninth couple to be eliminated.

In the fifth series, Cole partnered Kelly Brook. They withdrew in week 9 due to the death of Brook's father.

For the sixth series, Cole's dance partner was presenter Lisa Snowdon. They reached the finals but were eliminated in third place. Cole and Snowdon danced again in the 2008 Christmas special, performing a quickstep.

In Series 7 Cole's partner was businesswoman and media personality Jo Wood. They were eliminated in week 6.

In the eighth series, Cole's partner was American singer Michelle Williams; they were eliminated in the seventh week of competition.

For the ninth series, Cole was paired with singer Lulu. They were eliminated on the sixth week. Cole also stepped in to partner Holly Valance and Anita Dobson during weeks 7 and 9 respectively due to their original partners being injured.

For the tenth series, Cole was partnered with Olympic track cyclist, Victoria Pendleton. They were eliminated in the eighth week of competition.

In series 11, Cole partnered singer-songwriter Sophie Ellis-Bextor, reaching the final and being eliminated in fourth place.

For the twelfth series, his dance partner was Casualty actress Sunetra Sarker. They were the ninth couple to be eliminated.

Cole competed with television presenter Kirsty Gallacher in the show's thirteenth series and was eliminated in week 6. Following his elimination with Gallacher, Cole entered the Children in Need special which he won with actress Laura Main. Cole also took part in the 2015 Christmas Special, where he and series 11 winner Abbey Clancy danced a waltz.

For the show's fourteenth series, Cole was partnered with American singer Anastacia. They were placed in the bottom two in week 2, but an injury sustained by Anastacia meant they were unable to take part in the dance-off and the decision was referred to the public vote. Anastacia and Cole polled more votes than Melvin Odoom and Janette Manrara, and were allowed to stay in the competition. They were eventually eliminated in week 6.

In 2017 Cole returned for the fifteenth series, paired with Good Morning Britain presenter Charlotte Hawkins. They were eliminated in week 4. He took part in that year's Christmas Special, partnering Katie Derham: the couple won the event.

Strictly Come Dancing performances
Series 1 – with celebrity dance partner Natasha Kaplinsky
Series average: 33.0

Series 2 – with celebrity dance partner Sarah Manners
Series average: 24.2

Series 3 – with celebrity dance partner Fiona Phillips
Series average: 15.0

Series 4 with celebrity dance partner Claire King
Series average: 24.9

Series 5 – with celebrity dance partner Kelly Brook
Series average: 33.0

Series 6 – with celebrity dance partner Lisa Snowdon
Series average: 34.8

Series 7 – with celebrity dance partner: Jo Wood
Series average: 18.8

Series 8 – with celebrity dance partner Michelle Williams
Series average: 26.3

Series 9 – with celebrity dance partner Lulu
Series average: 24.8

Series 10 – with celebrity dance partner Victoria Pendleton
Series average: 24.1

Series 11 – with celebrity dance partner Sophie Ellis-Bextor
Series average: 33.3

Series 12 – with celebrity dance partner Sunetra Sarker
Series average: 28.4

Series 13 – with celebrity dance partner Kirsty Gallacher
Series Average 21.7

Series 14 – with celebrity dance partner Anastacia
Series Average 26.5

Due to Cole being too ill to dance on Week 5, Anastacia danced with Gorka Márquez.

Series 15 – with celebrity dance partner Charlotte Hawkins
Series average: 17.5

Charity work
Cole has supported several charity functions including children's anti-bullying campaigning group Act Against Bullying.

References

External links
BBC website for Strictly Come Dancing 
Brendan Cole website

1976 births
Living people
New Zealand ballroom dancers
New Zealand expatriates in England
New Zealand people of Scottish descent
People from Christchurch
Strictly Come Dancing winners
21st-century New Zealand dancers